Gilbert Hilton Scribner (April 23, 1831 – January 5, 1910) was an American lawyer and politician who was Secretary of State of New York from 1870 to 1873.

Biography
He was born on April 23, 1831, in Monroe County, New York to Sewell B. Scribner. he was a Republican member of the New York State Assembly (Westchester Co., 1st D.) in 1871.  He was President of the Belt Line Street Railroad of New York. In 1884, he authored an article titled Where Did Life Begin? in Popular Science. He married Sarah Woodbury Pettingill (born 1835).

He attended Oberlin College, then studied law under Daniel B. Taylor. He was admitted to the bar in 1856. In 1856 he married Sarah Woodbury Pettengill in Rochester, New York. He became a member of the New York State Legislature in 1869. In 1870 he became Secretary of State of New York and held that position until 1873.

He died at his residence "Inglehurst", on Pine Street on January 5, 1910, in Yonkers, New York.

Family
His daughter Sarah Marguerite (b. October 8, 1876) was an artist, poet and storywriter. She married (October 8, 1902) the third son of George Hamilton Frost, Edwin Hunt Frost (b. Chicago August 23, 1874).

References

External links
 

Secretaries of State of New York (state)
1831 births
1910 deaths
19th-century American railroad executives
Republican Party members of the New York State Assembly
People from Yonkers, New York
19th-century American politicians
Oberlin College alumni